The 1904–05 season was the tenth competitive season in Belgian football.

Overview
Only one official division existed at the time.  It was called Division I. The season was not completed.

Athletic and Running Club de Bruxelles withdrew at the end of the season.

National team
Belgium won its first official game against France on May 7, 1905.

* Belgium score given first

Key
 H = Home match
 A = Away match
 F = Friendly
 o.g. = own goal

Honour

League standings

External links
RSSSF archive - Final tables 1895-2002
Belgian clubs history